The 2019 South American U-17 Championship was the 18th edition of the South American U-17 Championship, the biennial international youth football championship organised by CONMEBOL for the men's under-17 national teams of South America. It was held in Peru from 21 March to 14 April 2019.

The top four teams, champions Argentina, which won their fourth title, Chile, Paraguay, and Ecuador, qualified for the 2019 FIFA U-17 World Cup in Brazil as the CONMEBOL representatives, besides Brazil who qualified automatically as hosts replacing Peru, despite failing to qualify out of the first stage as defending champions for the first time.

Teams
All ten CONMEBOL member national teams entered the tournament.

Venues

Peru was confirmed as host of the tournament at the CONMEBOL Council meeting held on 22 January 2019 in Rio de Janeiro. All games were scheduled to be played in Lima at the Estadio Universidad San Marcos.

Squads

Players born on or after 1 January 2002 are eligible to compete. Each team can register a squad of 23 players (three of whom must be goalkeepers).

Draw
The draw of the tournament was held on 27 February 2019, 12:00 PET (UTC−5), at the Peruvian Football Federation headquarters in Lima, Peru. The ten teams were drawn into two groups of five. The host Peru and the defending champions Brazil were seeded into Group A and Group B respectively and assigned to position 1 in their group, while the remaining eight teams were placed into four "pairing pots" according to their final positions in the 2017 South American U-17 Championship (shown in brackets).

Match officials
The referees and assistants referees were:

 Fernando Espinoza
Assistants: Maximiliano Del Yesso and Pablo González
 Ivo Méndez
Assistants: Reluy Vallejos and Ariel Guizada
 Rodolpho Toski
Assistants: Fabricio Vilarinho and Guilherme Dias Camilo
 Cristian Garay
Assistants: Alejandro Molina and Claudio Urrutia
 Carlos Herrera
Assistants: Sebastián Vela and John Gallego

 Luis Quiroz
Assistants: Edwin Bravo and Flavio Nall
 Juan Gabriel Benítez
Assistants: Rodney Aquino and Carlos Cáceres
 Kevin Ortega
Assistants: Coty Carrera and Jesús Sánchez
 Andrés Matonte
Assistants: Horacio Ferreiro and Martín Soppi
 Ángel Arteaga
Assistants: Lubin Torrealba and Alberto Ponte

Support Referees

 Juan Nelio García (Final stage)
 Bráulio da Silva Machado (Final stage)
 Nicolás Gallo (Final stage)

 Franklin Congo (First stage)
 Derlis López (First stage)
 Juan Soto (Final stage)

First stage
The top three teams in each group advance to the final stage.

All times local, PET (UTC−5).

Group A

Group B

Final stage
The schedule of the final matchday was modified based on which teams were possible to be champions.

Winners

Goalscorers

Qualified teams for FIFA U-17 World Cup
The following five teams from CONMEBOL qualify for the 2019 FIFA U-17 World Cup, including Brazil who qualified automatically as host.

1 Bold indicates champions for that year. Italic indicates hosts for that year.

References

External links
Sudamericano Sub 17 Perú 2019 , Official Web 
Sudamericano Sub 17 Perú 2019, CONMEBOL.com 

2019
2019 South American U-17 Championship
2019 in South American football
2019 in Peruvian football
2019 in youth association football
2019 FIFA U-17 World Cup qualification
March 2019 sports events in South America
April 2019 sports events in South America